Lasius meridionalis is a species of ant belonging to the family Formicidae.

It is native to Europe and Japan.

References

meridionalis
Insects described in 1920